Snape with Thorp is a civil parish in the Hambleton District of North Yorkshire, England. It comprises the village of Snape and the hamlet of Thorp. The population of the parish at the 2011 census was 410.

Within the parish lie the Grade I listed Snape Castle and Thorp Perrow, known for its extensive arboretum.

References

Civil parishes in North Yorkshire
Hambleton District